Richard Pudsey (fl. 1492) was an English politician.

Pudsey was a Member (MP) of the Parliament of England for Devizes in 1492.

References

Year of birth missing
Year of death missing
English MPs 1491